Heap was a district of Bury, England until it was abolished in 1894 to become parts of the parishes of Heywood, Bury, Bircle and Unsworth.

The district of Heap in the county of Lancashire was created in 1837 and abolished in 1894 to become parts of the parishes of Heywood, Bury, Birtle cum Bamford, and Unsworth.

References

https://www.british-history.ac.uk/vch/lancs/vol5/pp136-141

Bury, Greater Manchester